Liber is an unincorporated community in Wayne Township, Jay County, Indiana.

History
Liber was founded in 1853 and named from the presence of Liber College. A post office was established at Liber in 1872, and remained in operation until it was discontinued in 1902.

Geography

References

Unincorporated communities in Jay County, Indiana
Unincorporated communities in Indiana